Romania was scheduled to participate in the Eurovision Song Contest 2020 in Rotterdam, Netherlands before its cancellation due to the pandemic of the coronavirus disease 2019 (COVID-19) in China and its spread to other countries. Romania's artist, Roxen, was internally selected and announced on 11 February 2020. Their competing entry, "Alcohol You", was chosen during the national selection competition  on 1 March. Prior to the 2020 contest, Romania had participated in the Eurovision Song Contest 20 times since its first entry in 1994. Its highest placing had been third place, which the nation achieved in 2005 and 2010. In 2019, they failed to qualify for the contest's final for the second consecutive year. Prior to the scheduled Eurovision Song Contest 2020, "Alcohol You" was promoted by a lyric video, while Roxen appeared on several native talk shows and radio stations.

Background

Its highest placing in the contest, to this point, had been third place, which the nation achieved on two occasions: in 2005 with the song "Let Me Try" performed by Luminița Anghel and Sistem, and in 2010 with "Playing with Fire" by Paula Seling and Ovi. In 2019, Romania failed to qualify to the final, placing 13th in the second semi-final with Ester Peony's "On a Sunday". This marked the second consecutive time that the nation failed to qualify to the final of the Eurovision Song Contest since the introduction of semi-finals in 2004, after 2018. In September 2019,  (TVR) confirmed Romania's participation in the Eurovision Song Contest 2020. As of December 2019, the broadcaster was discussing the method to select a representing entry, which evolved as the subject of online controversy since precise information surrounding Romania's Eurovision participation had been given that time in preceding years. In addition, the mayors of Baia Mare and Buzău claimed the cities were potential hosts of a national final that was yet to be confirmed by TVR.

Before Eurovision

Artist selection 

On 31 January 2020, TVR confirmed their collaboration with native label Global Records for the selection of a Eurovision entry, citing their recent relevancy and success within Romania's music industry as reasons for the decision. Furthermore, it was announced that Liana Stanciu would return as the country's head of delegation. While Global Records was not remunerated, the project had cost TVR a reported €69,000. A jury panel—consisting of Luminița Anghel, Liviu Elekes, Dan Manoliu, Crina Mardare, Bogdan Păun, Lucian Ștefan and Andrei Tudor—was hired to select Romania's representing artist out of the label's roster. The segment  was aired by TVR, documenting the internal artist selection and songwriting camp.

In an online interview two days after TVR's announcement, Global Records's manager Ștefan announced that a male and two female artists had been shortlisted to represent Romania at Eurovision; they were later reported to be Cezar Gună, Diana V and Roxen. The latter was revealed as Romania's representative on 11 February, and the competing songs were released on 21 February. Roxen had risen to prominence in the country upon being featured on producer Sickotoy's "You Don't Love Me" in 2019, which reached number three on the Airplay 100 chart and was playlisted in several other territories.

Selecția Națională 2020 

 was the national final format organised by TVR in order to select Romania's entry for the Eurovision Song Contest 2020. The competition consisted of five songs—"Alcohol You", "Beautiful Disaster", "Cherry Red", "Colors" and "Storm"—out of which the winner was determined by a 50/50 combination of votes from a jury panel and a public televote (the latter would decide the winning song in case of a tie). The jury—consisting of Luminița Anghel, Crina Mardare, Alin Oprea, Edward Sanda and Andrei Tudor—awarded a set of points from five to zero, which was based on each member's individual set of votes from five to zero. The televoting was rendered down using the same scores.

With an audience of around 200,000 viewers,  was broadcast at 21:00 (EET) and hosted by Elena Gheorghe and Connect-R at Sala Sporturilor "Romeo Iamandi" in Buzău. The hosts also served as interval acts alongside Loreen, Sandro Nicolas, Ulrikke Brandstorp, Dora Gaitanovici and Natalia Gordienco. CocoRico, Cotnari and Top Line were among the sponsors of the event, while Buzău itself contributed with €200,000 towards it. Writing for Eurovision.de, Irving Wolther lauded Selecția Națională, calling it "so opulent that one might think that a future [Eurovision] winner is actually celebrating here". The full results of the national final were:

Promotion
Lyric videos to all entries were released on YouTube, eventually alongside "alternative" live versions (Crystal Freckles Session). Additionally, Global Records released merchandise related to Roxen. Upon selecting "Alcohol You" as the Romanian entry, Roxen performed it live on Virgin Radio Romania, and appeared on multiple other Romanian radio stations to give interviews.

At Eurovision
The Eurovision Song Contest 2020 was originally scheduled to take place at Rotterdam Ahoy in Rotterdam, Netherlands and consist of two semi-finals on 12 and 14 May, and the final on 16 May 2020. According to Eurovision rules, each country, except the host nation and the "Big Five" (France, Germany, Italy, Spain and the United Kingdom), would have been required to qualify from one of two semi-finals to compete for the final; the top ten countries from each semi-final would have progressed to the final. In January 2020, it was announced that Romania would be performing in the second half of the first semi-final of the contest. However, on 18 March, the European Broadcasting Union (EBU) announced the event's cancellation due to the pandemic of the coronavirus disease 2019 (COVID-19) in China and its spread to other countries. Although TVR had considered sending "Alcohol You" to participate in the Eurovision Song Contest 2021, EBU announced soon after that entries intended for 2020 would not be eligible for the following year. Roxen was nonetheless internally selected for 2021.

Alternative song contests 
Some of the broadcasters scheduled to take part in the Eurovision Song Contest 2020 have organised alternative competitions. Austria's ORF aired  in April 2020, which saw every entry being assigned to one of three semi-finals. A jury consisting of ten singers that had represented Austria at Eurovision before was hired to rank each song; the best-placed in each semi-final advanced to the final round. In the first semi-final on 14 April, "Alcohol You" placed seventh in a field of 14 participants, achieving 61 points. The song also unsuccessfully took part in Norddeutscher Rundfunk's  and Sveriges Television's  on 9 May.

References

2020
Countries in the Eurovision Song Contest 2020
Eurovision
Eurovision